The Bolshaya Ussurka (literally: "Great Ussuri") is a river in the Russian Far East in Primorsky Krai. It is a right tributary of the Ussuri, which it meets near Dalnerechensk.

The major tributaries of the Bolshaya Ussurka are the rivers Malinovka, Marevka, Naumovka and Armu.

References

Rivers of Primorsky Krai